Events in the year 1917 in Finland.

Establishments 

 Confederation of Salaried Employees
 Finnish Musicians' Union
 Genealogical Society of Finland
 Helsingin Palloseura
 Hyvinkää
 Kerberos (magazine)
 League of Workers Association Youth
 White Guard (Finland)

Events 
Ongoing - Finnish Civil War

 16 March – Governor-General of Finland Franz Albert Seyn is removed from his office and arrested
 19 March – Mikhail Aleksandrovich Stakhovich became the new Governor-General of Finland
 26 March – Oskari Tokoi is appointed as the Chairmen of the Senate
 18 July – Parliament of Finland accepts the Act of Rule of Law
 31 July – Provisional government of Russia dissolves the Parliament of Finland
 17 August – Oskari Tokoi resigns from the Senate, E.N. Setälä takes his place
 17 September – Nikolai Nekrasov become the new Governor-General of Finland
 1–2 October – 1917 Finnish parliamentary election
 27 November – Pehr Evind Svinhufvud is appointed as Chairman of the Senate, becoming the first Prime Minister of Finland.
 4 December – Svinhufvud senate declares Independence of Finland
 6 December – Finnish Declaration of Independence: Finland declares its independence from the Russian Empire following the Bolsheviks taking power.
 31 December –
 Soviet government recognizes the Independence of Finland
 Åland declares itself as part of Sweden

See Also 

 History of Finland (1917–present)
 Timeline of Independence of Finland (1917–1920)

References 

 
1910s in Finland
Years of the 20th century in Finland
Finland
Finland